Yabba Dabba Dinosaurs is an American animated streaming television series and a spin-off of the original series, The Flintstones. Like Cave Kids, the series focuses on the lives of best friends Pebbles Flintstone and Bamm-Bamm Rubble, who are joined by Dino for many adventures in the Stone Age. The series premiered on HBO Max on September 30, 2021. The series was removed from HBO Max in August 2022.

This is the first full-length Flintstones TV series in 19 years since The Rubbles and the first since the closure of the Hanna-Barbera studio and also the first Flintstones TV series without the original creators William Hanna and Joseph Barbera who both died respectively in 2001 and 2006.

Cast
 Jessica DiCicco as Pebbles Flintstone
 Ely Henry as Bamm-Bamm Rubble
 Jeff Bergman as Fred Flintstone, Mr. Slate
 Tress MacNeille as Wilma Flintstone
 Kevin Michael Richardson as Barney Rubble
 Grey Griffin as Betty Rubble
 Eric Bauza as Dino, The Great Gazoo
 Tom Megalis as Captain Caveman

Production
Yabba Dabba Dinosaurs first started production in 2016. The series was first announced in May 2018 with a planned release date for 2019, with plans to be released on the Boomerang subscription service. An animatic from the series was uploaded in August 2018. In September 2018, the episode The Grass Is Always Dinner was included as part of a survey from Boomerang's newsletter. The episode was later leaked and shared by various websites.

The series was intended to have two seasons, but in December 2018, character designer Will Terrell said that Yabba Dabba Dinosaurs would not be renewed for a second season.

Release
On August 19, 2021, as part of HBO Max's reveal of content released for September 2021, it was announced that Yabba Dabba Dinosaurs would be premiering on HBO Max as an original series on September 30. On January 20, 2022, as part of HBO Max's reveal of content released for February 2022, it was announced that the remaining episodes, marketed as the second season, would be released on February 17.

Episodes

Series overview

Season 1 (2021)

Season 2 (2022)

International broadcast
Yabba Dabba Dinosaurs first premiered on February 3, 2020, on Boomerang UK. Yabba Dabba Dinosaurs premiered on Boomerang CEE on February 29, 2020. The series started airing on Teletoon in Canada on September 5, 2020.

Notes

References

External links
 on Boomerang (UK and Ireland)
Yabba Dabba Dinosaurs at IMDb

The Flintstones spin-offs
2020s American animated television series
2021 American television series debuts
2022 American television series endings
American animated television spin-offs
American children's animated adventure television series
American children's animated comedy television series
American flash animated television series
Animated television series about children
Animated television series about dinosaurs
Animated television series about siblings
English-language television shows
Television series by Warner Bros. Animation
HBO Max original programming
Television series about cavemen